Tomlinson is a given name. Notable people with the name include:

Tomlinson Fort (disambiguation), various people
Tomlinson Holman (born 1946), American film theorist and educator
Tomlinson D. Todd, civil rights activist

See also
Tomlinson (surname)